Melaeneae or Melaineai, or Melaenae or Melainai (Μελαιναί), was a town of ancient Arcadia, in the territory of Heraea, and on the road from Heraea to Megalopolis. It was distant 40 stadia from Buphagium. Pausanias says that it was founded by Melaeneus, the son of Lycaon, but that it was deserted in his time and overflowed with water.

Its site is located near the modern Kakouraika, where the ruins include the remains of a Roman bath.

References

Populated places in ancient Arcadia
Former populated places in Greece